The vast majority of the Moldovan people are Orthodox Christians, but there is a small community of Muslims in Moldova,  numbering a few thousand.

In 2005, the Spiritual Organisation of Muslims in Moldova headed by Talgat Masaev was denied registration despite the appeal of the Mission to Moldova of the Organization for Security and Co-operation in Europe.

In March 2011, the Islamic League of Moldova (Liga Islamică din Moldova), an NGO representing Moldova's Muslims, was registered by the Moldovan Justice Ministry as the first legally recognized Muslim association in Moldova. It had applied for registration in 2008. 

The Moldovan Orthodox Church opposed the recognition of Islam and joined protests with conservative groups.

As of 2011, officially there were just 2,000 Muslims in Moldova. But the Islamic League of Moldova  head Sergiu Sochirca said the number was closer to 17,000, though not all of them were registered as Muslims due to suppression of Islam in the past.

Demographics
There are 2,009 Muslims living in Moldova according to the 2014 Moldovan census, an increase from the 1,667 Muslims that lived in Moldova according to the 2004 Moldovan census.  Most of the Muslims live in Chișinău (985 people), followed by Gagauzia (176 people), Bălți (76 people), Anenii Noi (68 people) and Cahul (54 people).

References

External links
Briefing: Moldova’s Unofficial Muslims
Moldova: Muslims Vow To Defy "Illegal" Worship Ban
Report on the Implementation of the Minorities Rights in Moldova

 
Moldova